Universidad Finis Terrae (UFT) is a Chilean university. It is a private autonomous institution in Santiago de Chile owned by the Anahuac University Network.

References

External links 
 UFT website 

Regnum Christi
Legion of Christ
Anahuac universities
Finis Terrae University
Universities in Chile
Universities in Santiago Metropolitan Region